The Maverick Movie Awards annually honors films and screenplays. They were founded as the New Haven Underground Film Festival in 2004, and became known as Maverick Movie Awards in 2008. The awards are given out by a panel of judges working in the film industry. Its winners include both big-budget studio films as well as low budget independent films. An international film competition and awards event, MMA has received submissions for awards consideration from many notable filmmakers including Academy Award-nominee Sue Goffe, Academy Award-nominee Grant Orchard, Academy Award-nominee Pierre Coffin, and BAFTA Award-winners Bart Layton and Dimitri Doganis. Additionally, numerous films submitted to Maverick Movie Awards have featured the work of notable actors such as Academy Award-winner Jim Broadbent, Doug Jones (actor), Ross Marquand, and Golden Globe-nominees Lee Meriwether and Judd Nelson; as well as the work of acclaimed cinematographers such as Academy Award-winner Vilmos Zsigmond and the original scores of composers such as Grammy Award-winner Thom Yorke, Academy Award-nominee Philip Glass, and Academy Award-nominee Johann Johannsson. Many Maverick Movie Award-winning films have gone on to receive other prestigious awards and nominations including A Morning Stroll (Academy Award-nominee; BAFTA Award-winner), The Imposter (2012 film) (BAFTA Award-winner; Sundance Film Festival Grand Jury Prize-nominee), Lost and Found (TV Movie 2008) (BAFTA Award-winner), and Varmints (BAFTA Award-nominee).

Winners

2018

Feature Film
Best Picture: Lost In Apocalypse
Best Director: Ben Rider and Xavier Baeyens, Blood and Bones

Short Film
Best Screenplay: Navjyot Bandiwadekar, Quarter

2017

Feature Film
Best Picture: Outlaw Painter
Best Documentary: The Children of the Noon
Best Animation: Three Days Drowning
Best Director: Vassilis Mazomenos, Lines
Best Screenplay: Occupant, Julia Camara
Best Cinematography: Ben Rider, Our Little Haven
Best Editing: Sam Szafrans / Outlaw Painter
Best Music: Forever Tomorrow
Best Special FX: Teleios
Best Actress: Alfeeya Shaikh in Jihad
Best Actor: Fedja van Huet in J. Kessels
Best Supporting Actress: Anu Hasan in IS THIS NOW
Best Supporting Actor: Arish A. Khan in Fags in the Fast Lane

2016

Feature Film
Best Picture: 1400
Best Documentary: All the World in a Design School
Best Animation: The Hunting of the Snark
Best Director: Stephen Chen, Silent City
Best Screenplay: Restraint, Adam Cushman
Best Cinematography: Russ De Jong, Badsville
Best Editing: Gordon Antell, Badsville
Best Music: The Barn
Best Special FX: Virtual Revolution
Best Actor: Michael Padraic Scahill, Cowards Do It Slow
Best Actress: Caitlyn Folley, Restraint
Best Supporting Actor: Hoyt Richards, Dumbbells
Best Supporting Actress: Gabrielle Rose, The Birdwatcher
Best Ensemble Performance: Legend Of The Lich Lord
Special Achievement: Arbitrary Fairytales

2014

Feature Film
Best Picture: Bridge and Tunnel (Director: Jason Michael Brescia)
Best Director: Alexander Tuschinski (for: Break-Up)
Best Screenplay: Time Lapse (Bradley King & B.P. Cooper)
Best Chronicle: chicagoGirl The Social Network Takes on a Dictator (Director: Joe Piscatella)
Best Cinematography: Kauboji (Predrag Dubravcic)

Short Film
Best Picture: Concrete/Night (Director: Noe Weil)
Best Director: Joshua Hinkson (for [])
Best Screenplay: The Funeral (Yehudah Jez Freedman)
Best Chronicle: Project: Shattered Silence (Director: Colleen Sparks Hamilton & Jared O'Roark)
Best Cinematography: By My Hand (Tucker Macdonald)

Feature Film

2013
Best Director: Dimitris Athanitis (for: Three Days Happiness)

Short Film
Best Picture: Mousse (Director: Jason Michael Brescia)

2012

Feature Film
Best Picture: The Imposter (Director: Bart Layton)

Short Film
Best Picture: Tumbleweed! (Director: Jared Varava)
Best Actor: Dylan Smith (in Hangnail)
Best Original Score: Atom

2011

Short Film
Best Soundtrack: Beatboxing - The Fifth Element of Hip Hop (Director: Klaus Schneyder)

Reception

References

External links
 Official Website
 IMDB-Event-Page
 Article on Moviemaker Magazine

American film awards